= Sharon Balaban =

Israeli video artist

Sharon Balaban שרון בלבן
- Born: 1971 (age 54–55); Jerusalem, Israel
- Style: Video art

Sharon Balaban (Hebrew: שרון בלבן) is an Israel artist. She creates short videos, from several seconds to 6 minutes.

== Early life and education ==
Balaban was born in Jerusalem, Israel. She graduated from Bezalel Academy of Art and Design in Jerusalem in 1999 and she finished her Master of Fine Arts at The City University of New York in 2003.

== Work ==
Balaban's short films represent objects and scenes from our own lives, from dish soap and pot cleaning to brushing teeth. She usually changes the original meanings of objects in order to present her concepts (Water flowing from tap resembles the luminous nude female, the peal of banana is a bird and dead bird flaps its wings). Her videos are whimsical and poetic. She aims to bring politics into her works indirectly, and uses household objects to create a discussion about gender roles and the place of the woman in the house, using video recording can manage to express her language.

She said in a 2014 interview:

“Art deals with the everyday, with consumerism, and art galleries upgrade the objects they exhibit – both in terms of the place and the price,”

Balaban's works are mostly made at home or studio instead of outdoor shoots. Objects, close-ups, body fragments, and nature are frequently used in her works. They also frequently employ simple techniques, short videos, ambient lighting and no scenography.

Balaban has presented her works in solo and group exhibitions in Israel, the US, Germany, Poland, Denmark, Belgium, Holland, and the Czech Republic. Currently, She lives and works as a head of The Video Unit at the Screen based arts department at the Bezalel Academy of Art and Design in Jerusalem.

== Awards and recognition ==
- Gesher Foundation Award for Jerusalem, Wildlife Diary, 2008
- Israeli Ministry of Culture – Encouragement of Creation Award, 2008
- Ministry of Culture – Young Artist Award, 2004
- Israeli Ministry of Immigration & Absorption – Returning Artist Scholarship (Cum Laude), 2003
- The America – Israel Cultural Foundation Scholarship Award for Artistic Achievement, 1998-2004
- Foundation for the Advancement of Interdisciplinary Art Award in Memory of Dan Zakheim, 1999
